Rohat Tuek is a commune (khum) and village of Mongkol Borei District in Banteay Meanchey Province in western Cambodia.

Villages

Pou Pir Daeum (ពោធិ៍ពីរដើម)
 Rohat Tuek (រហាត់ទឹក)
 Thnal Bat (ថ្នល់បត់)
 Kramol
 Khtum Chrum 
 Chak Lech 
 Doun Mul
 Preaek Samraong (ព្រែកសំរោង)
 Ou Dangkao (អូរដង្កោ)
 Chamkar Chek (ចំការចេក)
 Ou Chuob 
 Ka Svay
 Chak Kaeut

References

Communes of Banteay Meanchey province
Mongkol Borey District